Waffengesetz may refer to:

 Gun legislation in Germany
 Gun politics in Switzerland